At the 1904 Summer Olympics, five rowing events were contested. All competitions were held on Saturday, July 30.

It was the second appearance of the sport in Olympic competition. Coxless forms of the pairs and fours were introduced, replacing the coxed pairs and fours that had been used four years earlier. Sculling was expanded, with double sculls as well as singles.

Medal summary

Participating nations
A total of 44 rowers from two nations competed at the St. Louis Games:

Medal table
Only one of the 44 rowers who competed, Divie Duffield, did not win a medal. Duffield finished fourth in the single sculls event.

References

External links
 

 
1904 Summer Olympics events
1904
1904 in rowing